Daniel Zacapa (born July 19, 1951) is a Honduran-American movie actor. Zacapa played the role of Detective Taylor in the 1995 David Fincher film Seven. He has worked steadily since, amassing a number of television credits and a role in Up Close and Personal.

Early life 
Zacapa was born in Tegucigalpa in 1951. He moved to the United States to pursue an acting career in Los Angeles.

Career 
Zacapa played Tio Ruben of the Santiago family in Showtime's Resurrection Blvd., Renda in George Clooney's directorial debut Confessions of a Dangerous Mind, and a leading role in the independent film Coronado. Television appearances have included Six Feet Under, Judging Amy, The Practice, NYPD Blue, Seinfeld, Star Trek: Deep Space Nine''', Star Trek: Voyager, The Mentalist and a guest appearance on Criminal Minds. After that, he began to get involved in Honduran film productions like A Place in the Caribbean''.

Personal life 
Zacapa lives in Shady Cove, Oregon.

Filmography

Film

Television

References

External links

American male film actors
Hispanic and Latino American male actors
Living people
1951 births
Honduran emigrants to the United States
People from Tegucigalpa